The 1994 Monte Carlo Open was a men's tennis tournament played on outdoor clay courts. It was the 88th edition of the Monte Carlo Masters, and was part of the ATP Championship Series, Single-Week of the 1994 ATP Tour. It took place at the Monte Carlo Country Club in Roquebrune-Cap-Martin, France, near Monte Carlo, Monaco, from 18 April through 24 April 1994.

Sixth-seeded Andrei Medvedev won the singles title.

Finals

Singles

 Andrei Medvedev defeated  Sergi Bruguera, 7–5, 6–1, 6–3
 It was Medvedev's 1st singles title of the year, and his 7th overall. It was his 1st Masters title.

Doubles

 Nicklas Kulti /  Magnus Larsson defeated  Yevgeny Kafelnikov /  Daniel Vacek, 3–6, 7–6, 6–4

References

External links
 
 ATP tournament profile
 ITF tournament edition details